Mikes Tsamis (born 1895, date of death unknown) was a Greek water polo player. He competed in the men's tournament at the 1920 Summer Olympics.

References

External links
 

1895 births
Year of death missing
Greek male water polo players
Olympic water polo players of Greece
Water polo players at the 1920 Summer Olympics
Place of birth missing